The first regular session of the 145th General Assembly of the U.S. state of Georgia met from Monday, January 11, 1999, at 10:00 am, to Wednesday, March 24, at which time both houses adjourned sine die.

The second regular session of the Georgia General Assembly opened at 10:00 am on Monday, January 10, 2000, and adjourned sine die on Wednesday, March 22, 2000.

Officers

Senate

Presiding Officer

Majority leadership

Minority leadership

House of Representatives

Presiding Officer

Majority leadership

Minority Leadership

Members of the Georgia State Senate, 1999–2000

Members of the Georgia State House of Representatives, 1999–2000

References

Website of the 145th General Assembly of Georgia
Georgia House of Representatives Legislative Reports 1999-2000

Georgia (U.S. state) legislative sessions
1999 in American politics
2000 in American politics
1999 in Georgia (U.S. state)
2000 in Georgia (U.S. state)